The Online Film Critics Society Award for Best Actor is an annual film award given by the Online Film Critics Society to honor the best lead actor of the year.

Winners

1990s

2000s

2010s

2020s

References
 OFCS - Awards

Film awards for lead actor